Truro is a cathedral city and civil parish in Cornwall, England. It is Cornwall's county town, sole city and centre for administration, leisure and retail trading. Its population was 18,766 in the 2011 census. People of Truro can be called Truronians. It grew as a trade centre through its port and as a stannary town for tin mining. It became mainland Britain's southernmost city in 1876, with the founding of the Diocese of Truro. Sights include the Royal Cornwall Museum, Truro Cathedral (completed 1910), the Hall for Cornwall and Cornwall's Courts of Justice.

Toponymy
Truro's name may derive from the Cornish tri-veru meaning "three rivers", but authorities such as the Oxford Dictionary of English Place Names have doubts about the "tru" meaning "three". An expert on Cornish place-names, Oliver Padel, in A Popular Dictionary of Cornish Place-names, called the "three rivers" meaning "possible". Alternatively the name may come from tre-uro or similar, i. e. settlement on the river Uro.

History
A castle was built in the 12th century by Richard de Luci, Chief Justice of England in the reign of Henry II, who for court services was granted land in Cornwall, including the area round the confluence of the two rivers. The town grew below the castle and gained borough status from further economic activity. The castle has long disappeared.

Richard de Lucy fought in Cornwall under Count Alan of Brittany after leaving Falaise late in 1138. The small adulterine castle at Truro, Cornwall, originally the parish of Kenwyn, later known as "Castellum de Guelon", was probably built by him in 1139–1140. He styled himself "Richard de Lucy, de Trivereu". The castle passed to Reginald FitzRoy, an illegitimate son of Henry I, when he was invested by King Stephen as the first Earl of Cornwall. Reginald married Mabel FitzRichard, daughter of William FitzRichard, a major landholder in Cornwall. The -diameter castle was in ruins by 1270 and the motte was levelled in 1840. Today Truro Crown Court stands on the site. In a charter of about 1170, Reginald FitzRoy confirmed to Truro's burgesses the privileges granted by Richard de Lucy. Richard held ten knights' fees in Cornwall before 1135. At his death the county still accounted for a third of his considerable total holding.

By the early 14th century Truro was a major port, due to an inland location away from invaders, to prosperity from the fishing industry, and to a role as a stannary town for assaying and stamping tin and copper from Cornish mines. The Black Death brought a trade recession and an exodus that left the town in a very neglected state. Trade and prosperity gradually returned in the Tudor period. Local government came in 1589 with a new charter of Elizabeth I giving it an elected mayor and control over the port of Falmouth.

During the Civil War in the 17th century, Truro raised a sizeable force to fight for the king and a royalist mint was set up. Defeat by Parliamentary troops came after the Battle of Naseby in 1646, when the victorious General Fairfax led his army south-west to relieve Taunton and capture the Royalist-held West Country. The Royalist forces surrendered at Truro while leading Royalist commanders, including Lord Hopton, the Prince of Wales, Sir Edward Hyde, and Lord Capell, fled to Jersey from Falmouth.

Later in the century, Falmouth gained its own charter, giving rights to its harbour and starting a long rivalry with Truro. The dispute was settled in 1709 with control of the River Fal divided between them. The arms of Truro city are "Gules the base wavy of six Argent and Azure, thereon an ancient ship of three masts under sail, on each topmast a banner of St George, on the waves in base two fishes of the second."

Truro prospered in the 18th and 19th centuries through improved mining methods and higher prices for tin, and its consequent attraction to wealthy mine-owners. Elegant Georgian and Victorian townhouses of the period can be seen today in Lemon Street, named after the mining magnate and local Member of Parliament Sir William Lemon. Truro became the centre for county society, even dubbed "the London of Cornwall".

Through those prosperous times Truro remained a social centre. Among the many notables were Richard Lander, the first European explorer to reach the mouth of the River Niger in Africa and was awarded the first gold medal of the Royal Geographical Society, and Henry Martyn, who read mathematics at Cambridge, was ordained and became a missionary, translating the New Testament into Urdu and Persian. Others include Humphry Davy, educated in Truro and the inventor of the miner's safety lamp, and Samuel Foote, an actor and playwright from Boscawen Street.

Truro's importance increased later in the 19th century with an iron-smelting works, potteries, and tanneries. From the 1860s, the Great Western Railway provided a direct link to London Paddington. The Bishopric of Truro Act 1876 gave the town a bishop and later a cathedral. In 1877 it gained city status. The New Bridge Street drill hall was completed in the late 19th century.

Geography

The valleys form a steep bowl surrounding the city on the north, east and west, open to the Truro River in the south. This shape, along with high precipitation that swells the rivers and a spring tide in the River Fal, were major factors in the 1988 floods that seriously damaged the city centre. Since then, flood defences have been constructed, including an emergency dam at New Mill on the River Kenwyn and a tidal barrier on the Truro River.

The city is amidst several protected natural areas such as the historic parklands at Pencalenick and areas of ornamental landscape such as Trelissick Garden and Tregothnan down the Truro River. An area south-east of the city, including Calenick Creek, has been included in the Cornwall Area of Outstanding Natural Beauty. Other protected zones include an Area of Great Landscape Value comprising farmland and wooded valleys to the north east, and Daubuz Moors, a local nature reserve by the River Allen, close to the city centre.

Truro has mainly grown and developed round the historic city centre in a nuclear fashion along the slopes of the bowl valley, except for fast linear development along the A390 to the west, towards Threemilestone. As Truro grew, it encompassed other settlements as suburbs or districts, including Kenwyn and Moresk to the north, Trelander to the east, Newham to the south, and Highertown, Treliske and Gloweth to the west.

Climate
The Truro area, like the rest of Cornwall, has an oceanic climate. This means fewer extremes in temperature than elsewhere in England, marked by high rainfall, cool summers and mild winters with infrequent frosts.

Demography and economy

The Truro urban area, including parts of surrounding parishes, had a 2001 census population of 20,920. By 2011 the population, including Threemilestone, was 23,040. Its status as the county's prime destination for retail and leisure and administration is unusual in that it is only its fourth most populous settlement. Indeed, population growth at 10.5 per cent between 1971 and 1998 was slow compared with other Cornish towns and Cornwall.

Major employers include the Royal Cornwall Hospital, Cornwall Council and Truro College. There are about 22,000 jobs available in Truro, but only 9,500 economically active people living there, which make commuting a major factor in its traffic congestion. Average earnings are higher than elsewhere in Cornwall.

Housing prices in Truro in the 2000s were 8 or more per cent higher than in the rest of Cornwall. Truro was named in 2006 as the top small city in the United Kingdom for rising house prices, at 262 per cent since 1996.

Culture

Attractions
It was built in 1880–1910 on the site of St Mary's Church, consecrated over 600 years earlier. Georgian architecture is well represented, with terraces and townhouses along Walsingham Place and Lemon Street often said to be "the finest examples of Georgian architecture west of the city of Bath".

The main attraction to the region is a wide variety of shopping facilities. Truro has various chain stores, speciality shops and markets that reflect its history as a market town. The indoor Pannier Market is open all year with many stalls and small businesses. The city is also popular for catering and night life, with bars, clubs and restaurants. It houses the Hall for Cornwall, a performing arts and entertainment venue.

The Royal Cornwall Museum is the oldest and premier museum of Cornish history and culture. Its collections cover fields such as archaeology, art and geology. Among the exhibits is the so-called Arthur's inscribed stone. Its parks and open spaces include Victoria Gardens, Boscawen Park and Daubuz Moors.

Events

Lemon Quay is the year-round centre of most festivities in Truro.

In April, Truro prepares to partake in the Britain in Bloom competition, with floral displays and hanging baskets dotted around the city throughout the summer. A "continental market" comes to Truro in the holiday-making season, featuring food and craft stalls from France, Spain, Italy, Germany, Belgium, the Netherlands, Greece and elsewhere.

The Truro City Carnival, held every September over a weekend, includes various arts and music performances, children's activities, a fireworks display, food and drinks fairs, a circus, and a parade. A half-marathon organised by Truro Running Club also occurs in September, running from the city centre into the country towards Kea, returning to finish at Lemon Quay.

Truro's Christmas includes a Winter Festival with a "City of Lights" paper lantern parade. Local schools, colleges, and community and youth groups join in.

Sports
Truro temporarily held the Cornish Pirates rugby union club in the 2005–2006 season, but it moved again for 2006–2007 to share the ground of Camborne RFC. In April 2018, the construction of a Stadium for Cornwall was discussed with Cornwall Council, which had pledged £3 million for the £14.3 million project. It is planned for a site in Threemilestone. The town's remaining rugby union side, Truro RFC, founded in 1885. It belongs to Tribute Western Counties West and plays home games at St Clements Hill. It has hosted the CRFU Cornwall Cup several times.

Truro City F.C., a football team in the National League South, is the only Cornish club ever to reach this tier of the English football league system. It achieved national recognition by winning the FA Vase in 2007 against A.F.C. Totton in only the second final at the new Wembley Stadium, becoming the first Cornish side ever to win that award. Its home ground is Treyew Road. Cornwall County Cricket Club plays some home fixtures at Boscawen Park, also the home ground of Truro Cricket Club.

Truro Fencing Club is a national flagship, having won numerous national championships and supplied three fencers for Team GB at the London 2012 Olympics.

Other sports amenities include a leisure centre, golf course and tennis courts.

Media

Truro is the centre of Cornwall's local media. The county weeklies, the Cornish Guardian and The West Briton, are based there, the latter providing a Truro and Mid-Cornwall edition. The city also holds the studios of BBC Radio Cornwall, and those of the West district of ITV Westcountry, whose main studio is now in Bristol after a merger with ITV West. This closed the studio in Plymouth – the Westcountry Live programme was replaced by The West Country Tonight.

Customs
A mummers play text ascribed until recently to Mylor, Cornwall (quoted in studies of folk plays such as The Mummers Play by R. J. E. Tiddy – published posthumously in 1923 – and The English Folk-Play (1933) by E. K. Chambers), has now been shown by genealogical and other research to have originated in Truro about 1780.

The traditional Nine Lessons and Carols at Christmas originated in Truro in 1880, when its bishop, Edward White Benson, began to provide chances for evening singing of carols before Christmas Day, often on Christmas Eve.

Administration

Truro City Council forms its basic level of government, as one of 213 parish bodies in the county. Centred upstairs at the Municipal Buildings in Boscawen Street, it covers Truro's public library, parks and gardens, tourist information centre, allotments and cemeteries. It also views planning issues and was involved in creating the Truro and Kenwyn Neighbourhood Plan in association with Cornwall Council. The City Council has four wards – Boscawen, Moresk, Tregolls and Trehaverne – with 24 councillors elected for four-year terms. It is affiliated to Truro Chamber of Commerce and other civic bodies.

The City Council comes under the unitary Cornwall Council, which is directly under central government. Cornwall Council, a unitary authority, is based at Lys Kernow, formerly County Hall, west of the city centre. It covers planning, infrastructure, development and environmental issues. Truro seats four members on it, one from each of its wards: Truro Tregolls, Truro Boscawen, Truro Redannick and Truro Trehaverne. Threemilestone and Gloweth, conurbations of the city, also elect a member.

Truro's borough court, first granted in 1153, became a free borough in 1589, and a city in 1877, receiving letters patent after the Anglican diocese was placed there in 1876. However, it forms the eighth smallest UK city in population, city council area and urban area.

Twinning
Truro is twinned with 
Boppard, Rhineland-Palatinate, Germany
Morlaix, Brittany, France

Namesakes
Several towns outside Britain have taken Truro as their name:
Truro, Nova Scotia, Canada
Truro, Massachusetts, United States
Truro, Iowa, United States
Truro, South Australia, Australia

Transport

Roads and bus services
Also passing through is the A390 between Redruth to the west and Liskeard to the east, where it joins the A38 for Plymouth, Exeter and the M5 motorway.

The city and surroundings have extensive bus services, mainly from First Kernow and Transport for Cornwall. Most routes terminate at Truro bus station near Lemon Quay. A permanent Park and Ride scheme, known as Park for Truro, opened in August 2008. Buses based at Langarth Park in Threemilestone carry commuters into the city via Truro College, the Royal Cornwall Hospital Treliske, County Hall, Truro railway station, the Royal Cornwall Museum and Victoria Square, through to a second car park on the east side of Truro. Truro also has long-distance coach services run by National Express.

Railways

North-east of the station is a  stone viaduct with views over the city, cathedral and Truro River in the distance. The longest viaduct on the line, it replaced Isambard Kingdom Brunel's wooden Carvedras Viaduct in 1904. Connecting to the main line at Truro is the Maritime Line to Falmouth in the south.

Truro's first railway station, at Highertown, was opened in 1852 by the West Cornwall Railway for trains to Redruth and Penzance, and was known as Truro Road Station. It was extended to the Truro River at Newham in 1855, but closed, so that Newham served as the terminus. When the Cornwall Railway connected the line to Plymouth, its trains ran to the present station above the city centre. The West Cornwall Railway (WCR) diverted most passenger trains to the new station, leaving Newham mainly as a goods station until it closed in 1971. The WCR became part of the Great Western Railway. The route from Highertown to Newham is now a cycle path on a countryside loop through the south side of the city.

Air and river transport
It was thought in 2017 to be the "fastest growing airport" in the UK. It has regular flights to London Heathrow and other airports, and to the Isles of Scilly, Dublin and Düsseldorf, Germany.

There is a boat link to Falmouth along the Truro and Fal four times a day, tide permitting. The fleet run by Enterprise Boats as part of the Fal River Links calls on the way at Malpas, Trelissick, Tolverne and St Mawes.

Churches

The old parish church of Truro was St Mary's, which was incorporated into the cathedral in the later 19th century. The building dates from 1518, with a later tower and spire dating from 1769.

Parts of the town were in the parishes of Kenwyn and St Clement (Moresk) until the mid 19th century, when other parishes were created. The lofty St George's church in Truro, designed by Rev. William Haslam, vicar of Baldhu, was built of Cornish granite in 1855. The parish of St George's Truro was formed from part of Kenwyn in 1846. In 1865 two more parishes were created: St John's from part of Kenwyn and St Paul's from part of St Clement. St George's contains a large wall painting behind the high altar, the work of Stephany Cooper in the 1920s. Her father, Canon Cooper, had been a missionary in Zanzibar and elsewhere. The theme of the mural is "Three Heavens": the first heaven has views of Zanzibar and its cathedral (a happy period in the life of the artist), the second views of the city of Truro including the cathedral, the railway viaduct and St George's Church (another happy period), and the third, above the others, separated from them by the River of Life (Christ is seen bridging the river and 17 saints including St Piran and St Kenwyn are depicted).

Charles William Hempel was organist of St Mary's Church for 40 years from 1804 and also taught music. In 1805 he composed and printed Psalms from the New Version for the use of the Congregation of St. Mary's, and in 1812 Sacred Melodies for the same congregation. These melodies gained popularity.

The oldest church in Truro is at Kenwyn, on the northern side. It dates from the 14th and 15th centuries, but was almost wholly rebuilt in 1820, having deteriorated to the point where it was deemed unsafe.

St John's Church (dedicated to St John the Evangelist) was built in 1828 (architect P. Sambell) in the Classical style on a rectangular plan and with a gallery. Alterations were carried out in the 1890s.

St Paul's Church was built in 1848. The chancel was replaced in 1882–1884, the new chancel being the work of J. D. Sedding. The tower is "broad and strong" (Pevsner) and the exterior of the aisles are ornamented in Sedding's version of the Perpendicular style. In the parish of St Paul is the former Convent of the Epiphany (Anglican) at Alverton House, Tregolls Road, an early 19th-century house extended for the convent of the Community of the Epiphany and the chapel was built in 1910 by Edmund H. Sedding. The sisterhood was founded by the Bishop of Truro, George Howard Wilkinson in 1883 and closed in 2001 when two surviving nuns moved into care homes. The sisters had been involved in pastoral and educational work and care of the cathedral and St Paul's Church. St Paul's Church, built with a tower on a river bed with poor foundations, has fallen into disrepair and is no longer used. Services are now held at the churches of St Clement, St George, and St John. St Paul and St Clement form a united benefice, as do St George and St John.

Other denominations
One Methodist place of worship remains in use, in Union Place – Truro Methodist Church – which has a broad granite front (1830, but since enlarged). There is a Quaker Meeting House in granite (c. 1830) and numerous other churches, some meeting in their own modern buildings, e. g. St Piran's Roman Catholic church and All Saints, Highertown, and some in schools or halls. St Piran's, dedicated to Our Lady of the Portal and St Piran, was built on the site of a medieval chapel by Margaret Steuart Pollard in 1973, for which she received the Benemerenti Medal from the Pope. The Baptist church building occupies the site of the former Lake's pottery, one of the oldest in Cornwall.

Education
A free grammar school associated with St Mary's Church was endowed in the 16th century. Its distinguished pupils have included the scientist Sir Humphry Davy, General Sir Hussey Vivian and the clergyman, Henry Martyn.

The former Truro Girls Grammar School was converted into a Sainsbury's supermarket.

Educational institutions in Truro today include:
Archbishop Benson – A Church of England voluntary aided primary school
Polwhele House Preparatory School — since the closure of Truro Cathedral School educating also the 18 boy choristers of Truro Cathedral
Truro School — a public school founded in 1880
Truro High School for Girls — a public school for ages 13–18
Penair School — a state co-educational science college for ages 11–16
Richard Lander School — a state co-educational technology college for ages 11–16
Truro and Penwith College — A further and higher education college attached to the Combined Universities in Cornwall
University of Exeter Medical School

Development

Truro has many proposed urban development schemes, most of which are intended to counter the main problems, notably traffic congestion and lack of housing.

Major proposals include construction of a distributor road to carry traffic away from the busy Threemilestone-Treliske-Highertown corridor, reconnecting at either Green Lane or Morlaix Avenue. This will also serve the new housing planned for that area.

Changes proposed for the city centre include pedestrianisation of main shopping streets and beautification of uncharacteristic storefronts built in the 1960s. New retail developments on the current Carrick District Council site and Garras Wharf waterfront site will provide more space for shops, open spaces and public amenities. Along with redevelopment of the waterfront, a tidal barrier is planned to dam water into the Truro River, which is currently blighted by mud banks that appear at low tide.

Controversial plans include the construction of a new stadium for Truro City F.C. and the Cornish Pirates, and relocation of the city's golf course to make way for more housing. A smaller project is the addition of two large sculptures in the Piazza.

Notable residents

Public thinking, public service
Sir Henry Killigrew (c. 1528–1603), Cornish diplomat and an ambassador
Owen Fitzpen (1552–1636), philanthropist and merchant seaman, led a successful slave revolt in 1627 to free captives of Barbary pirates, memorialised on a plaque in St Mary's Church.
John Robartes, 1st Earl of Radnor (1606–1685) a politician who fought for the Parliamentary cause 
William Gwavas (1676–1741), barrister and writer in the Cornish language 
Edward Boscawen (1711–1761), Royal Navy admiral, eponym of a cobbled street at the centre of Truro and a park  
Samuel Walker (1714–1761), evangelical clergyman, curate of Truro from 1746
Richard Polwhele (1760–1838) a clergyman, poet and historian of Cornwall and Devon 
Charles Sandoe Gilbert (1760–1831), druggist and historian of Cornwall 
Hussey Vivian, 1st Baron Vivian (1775–1842) a senior British cavalry officer
Henry Martyn (1781–1812), Cambridge mathematician and missionary in India and Persia, who translated the Bible into local languages 
Thomas Wilde, 1st Baron Truro (1782–1855) Lord High Chancellor, 1850 to 1852.
Admiral Sir Barrington Reynolds (1786–1861) senior Royal Navy officer 
FitzRoy Somerset, 1st Baron Raglan (1788–1855) a senior Army officer and MP for Truro in 1818 & 1826. 
Richard Spurr (1800–1855), cabinet maker and lay preacher imprisoned for Chartism. A large allotment in the town was dedicated to him in 2011.
Major-General Sir Henry James (1803–1877), a Royal Engineers officer and DG of the Ordnance Survey 1854–1875
Richard Lemon Lander (1804–1834), explorer in West Africa. A local secondary school is named in his honour and a monument to his memory stands at the top of Lemon Street.
John Lander (1806–1839), printer and explorer with his brother Richard Lemon Lander
Charles Chorley (c. 1810–1874), journalist and man of letters 
William Bennett Bond (1815–1906), Canadian priest and second primate of the Anglican Church of Canada
Alexander Mackennal (1835–1904), nonconformist minister 
Silvanus Trevail (1851–1903) local architect and mayor of Truro
Joseph Hunkin (1887–1950), Bishop of Truro from 1935 to 1950
James Henry Fynn (Finn, 1893–1917), recipient of the Victoria Cross
Barbara Joyce West (1911–2007), second-to-last survivor of the 
Alison Adburgham (1912–1997), social historian and fashion journalist, died in the town.
Hugh Clegg (1920–1995), academic, founded the National Board for Prices and Incomes (1965–1971)
David Penhaligon (1944–1986), politician, Liberal MP for Truro 1974–1986
Paul Myners, Baron Myners, (1948-2022), businessman and politician
Mark Laity (born c. 1962), NATO spokesman and former BBC correspondent
NneNne Iwuji-Eme (born c. 1978), British diplomat, UK High Commissioner to Mozambique
Staff Sergeant Olaf Schmid, (1979–2009), a British Army bomb-disposal expert

Arts

Giles Farnaby (c. 1563–1640), composer and virginalist 
Samuel Foote (1720–1777), actor and playwright
Henry Bone (1755–1834), porcelain, jewellery and enamel painter
Joseph Antonio Emidy (1775–1835), former slave from Guinea turned violinist
Charles William Hempel (1777–1855), organist of St Mary's Church, Truro, and poet 
Nicholas Michell (1807–1880) a Cornish writer, best known for his poetry 
Charles Frederick Hempel (1811–1867), organist and composer 
Walter Hawken Tregellas (1831–1894) professional draughtsman and historical and biographical writer
Francis Charles Hingeston-Randolph (1833–1910), cleric, antiquary and author
Henry Dawson Lowry (1869–1906), journalist, short story writer, novelist and poet 
Hugh Walpole (1884–1941) novelist, who attended a preparatory school in Truro
Maria Kuncewiczowa (1895–1989), Polish writer living in Truro after WWII. Her novel Tristan 1946 was set here.
Margaret Steuart Pollard (1904–1996), poet and translator lived in Truro from 1930s
William Golding (1911–1993), novelist, playwright and poet, gained the Nobel Prize in Literature in 1983. Born in St Columb Minor, he returned to live near Truro in 1985.
Alison Adburgham (1912–1997), author, social historian and fashion editor of The Guardian
Irene Newton (1915–1992), artist
Catherine Grubb, artist (born 1945), lives in Truro.
Roger Taylor (born 1949), drummer from the rock band Queen
Robert Goddard (born 1954), novelist, lives in Truro.
James Marsh (born 1963), film director and Academy Award winner
Ben Salfield (born 1971), guitarist, lutenist, composer and teacher, has lived in Truro since age of nine.
Paul Kerensa (born 1979), comedy writer and stand-up comedian
Brett Harvey (born c. 1980), film writer and director based in Cornwall
Calvin Dean (born 1985), award-winning actor

Science and business
John Vivian (1750–1826) industrialist in Swansea, descendant of the Vivian family
Elizabeth Andrew Warren (1786–1864) a Cornish botanist and marine algologist
Charles Foster Barham (1804–1884), physician and writer on public health
Edwin Dunkin (1821–1898) an astronomer and the president of the Royal Astronomical Society
Henry Charlton Bastian (1837–1915), physiologist and neurologist
Edward Arnold (1857–1942), a publisher, founded Edward Arnold Publishers Ltd in 1890.
Elsie Wilkins Sexton (1868–1959) a zoologist and biological illustrator
H. Lou Gibson (1906–1992), expert in medical uses of infrared to detect breast cancer

Sport

Nick Nieland (born 1972), javelin gold medallist at the 2006 Commonwealth Games 
Matthew Etherington (born 1981), former professional footballer with 426 club caps, he played for West Ham and Stoke City.
David Paynter (born 1981), former first-class cricketer
Tom Voyce (born 1981) former rugby union footballer with London Wasps and England
Annabel Vernon (born 1982), retired rower, team silver medallist at the 2008 Summer Olympics 
Chris Harris (born 1982), international speedway rider
Gemma Prescott (born 1983), Paralympic track and field athlete
Darren Dawidiuk (born 1987), rugby union footballer
Craig Alcock (born 1987), professional footballer with 300 club caps
Matthew Whorwood (born 1989), Paralympic swimmer, bronze medallist in two Paralympic Games
Matthew Shepherd (born 1990), rugby union player
Alex Quinn (born 2000), racing driver

See also

Diocese of Truro
List of topics related to Cornwall

References

External links

Truro City Council website
Cornwall Record Office Online Catalogue for Truro
Truro – historic characterisation for regeneration (CSUS)
Enjoy Truro – official guide to the city, including latest news and events (provided by Totally Truro, the local not-for-profit Business Improvement District)

 
Cornish capitals
Cities in South West England
Towns in Cornwall
Civil parishes in Cornwall
County towns in England
Populated places established in the 12th century
Ports and harbours of Cornwall
Cornish Killas